Francis "Frank" Boylen (December 1878 – 3 February 1938), also known by the nickname of "Patsy", was an English rugby union, and professional rugby league footballer who played in the 1900s and 1910s. He played representative level rugby union (RU) for England and Durham, and at club level for Hartlepool Excelsior, Hartlepool Old Boys, Hartlepool Rovers and West Hartlepool R.F.C., and representative level rugby league (RL) for Great Britain, England and Yorkshire, and at club level for Hull F.C. (two spells, including the second as World War I guest), York and Hull Kingston Rovers as a forward (prior to the specialist positions of), during the era of contested scrums,

Background
Frank Boylen was born in Hartlepool, County Durham, and he died aged 59 in Kingston upon Hull, East Riding of Yorkshire, England.

Playing career

International honours
Frank Boylen won caps for England (RU) while at Hartlepool Rovers, and/or West Hartlepool R.F.C., in 1908 against France, Wales, Ireland, and Scotland, and won caps for England (RL) while at Hull in 1909 against Australia, and Wales, in 1910 against Wales, and won a cap for Great Britain (RL) while at Hull in 1909 against Australia.

County honours

Frank Boylen won caps for Durham (RU) while at Hartlepool Rovers, and/or West Hartlepool R.F.C., winning the rugby union County Championship title in 1905, and 1907 (title shared with Devon Rugby Football Union), and played for Durham (RU) in the 3–16 defeat by New Zealand (The Original All Blacks) at Durham Ground on 7 October 1905, and the 4–22 defeat by South Africa (1906–07 South Africa rugby union tour) at Hartlepool on 6 October 1906.

Challenge Cup Final appearances
Frank Boylen played as a forward, i.e. number 10, in Hull FC's 0–17 defeat by Wakefield Trinity in the 1909 Challenge Cup Final during the 1908–09 season at Headingley Rugby Stadium, Leeds on Saturday 24 April 1909, in front of a crowd of 23,587.

Club career
Frank Boylen played in the combined Hartlepool Clubs 0–63 defeat by The Original All Blacks at Hartlepool Rovers' ground on 11 October 1905.

Outside of rugby
Frank Boylen worked at the British Oxygen Company (BOC) in Kingston upon Hull.

Genealogical information
Frank Boylen's parents John and Mary (Morgan) were Irish. Frank Boylen married Florence Maud Mary King at Holy Trinity Church, Hartlepool, on 28 December 1902. He had two sisters, Nellie born 1885 and Mary born in 1879 and a brother, James, born in 1887. The 1881 census shows the family living at 8 Fox Street in Hartlepool. 1891 Census showed the brothers as being in Hartlepool workhouse. The couple had five children: Frank (1903), Florence (1905), Doris, Vera and Eric (died age 3). They also brought up Florence's sisters children: Jane, George and Florence Barningham.

References

External links
 (archived by web.archive.org) Stats → PastPlayers → B at hullfc.com
 (archived by web.archive.org) Statistics at hullfc.com
Rugby-mad collector's 114-year challenge
Frank Boylen at ovalballs.com
Photograph "FRANK BOYLEN (Forward) – Member of the 1910 Tour Team to Australia" at ovalballs.com 
Photograph of Frank Boylen with caps at ovalballs.com 

1878 births
1938 deaths
Dual-code rugby internationals
Durham County RFU players
England international rugby union players
England national rugby league team players
English rugby league players
English rugby union players
Great Britain national rugby league team players
Hartlepool Rovers players
Hull F.C. players
Hull Kingston Rovers players
Rugby league forwards
Rugby league players from County Durham
Rugby union players from Hartlepool
West Hartlepool R.F.C. players
York Wasps players